The Men's Hoofdklasse Hockey, currently known as the Tulp Hoofdklasse Men for sponsorship reasons, is the men's top division of field hockey in the Netherlands. The league ranks third in the European league ranking table. The league was established in 1973, and before the league existed the champions of the several district played in a championship pool to determine the national champion.

Bloemendaal are the current champions, having won the 2021–22 season by defeating Pinoké in the championship final. Bloemendaal has the most titles with 22 followed by Amsterdam with 21.

Format
The season starts in August or September of each year and is interrupted by the indoor hockey season from November to February. From March the outdoor season will be continued. The league is played by twelve teams who play each other twice and who compete for four spots in the championship play-offs. The number one and four and the number two and three play each other in the semi-final and the winners qualify for the final where the winner will be crowned champion. The last placed team is relegated to the second division, the Promotieklasse. The eleventh-placed team plays in a relegation play-off against the runners-up of the Promotieklasse and the tenth-placed team plays a relegation play-off against the third-placed from the Promotieklasse. The winners of these matches will play the next season in the Hoofdklasse.

Clubs

Accommodation and locations

List of champions

National champions (1897–1973)

Hoofdklasse era (1973–present)

Champions

By club

By province

Media coverage
Since 2015, almost every Sunday, one match from either the men's or the women's league is broadcast live by either Ziggo Sport or the NOS.

See also
Women's Hoofdklasse Hockey

References

 
Field hockey leagues in the Netherlands
Sports leagues established in 1973
1973 establishments in the Netherlands
Neth
Professional sports leagues in the Netherlands